A summer house or summerhouse traditionally refers to a building or shelter used for relaxation in warm weather. This would often take the form of a small, roofed building on the grounds of a larger one, but could also be built in a garden or park, often designed to provide cool shady places of relaxation or retreat from the summer heat.

It can also refer to a second residence, usually located in the country, that provides a cool and relaxing home to live in during the summer, such as a vacation property.

In the Nordic countries

Especially in the Nordic countries, sommerhus (Danish), sommarstuga (Swedish), hytte (Norwegian), sumarbústaður or sumarhús (Icelandic) or kesämökki (Finnish) is a summer residence (as a second home). It can be a larger dwelling like a cottage rather than a simple shelter.

Most are timber constructions, often suitable for year-round use. Increasingly they have additions such as saunas, heating ovens, fireplaces, or attractive gardens. Increasingly, English speakers call them summerhouses. A Swedish "sommarstuga" is traditionally painted with a special red colour called "falu rödfärg and has white trimmed corners, windows, and doors."

Many of the Danish resorts depend on the rental of summerhouses to accommodate national and foreign tourists who can rent them, usually on a weekly basis, at prices (for a family) well below those of hotels. But Scandinavians often spend a considerable amount of time in their summerhouses which are often the venue for family reunions or simply weekends away from the office.

In recent years, the popularity and, thus, the cost of summerhouses has increased appreciably, particularly in Denmark's coastal resorts. Under Danish law, owners are generally not permitted to use these houses as permanent homes; an exception is made for pensioners.

In some attractive areas of Norway, there is "residence duty" (Norwegian:boplikt), meaning that an owner of a house must use it as their primary home and spend most of their overnight stays there. Other areas of Norway are defined as "summer house areas", where it is forbidden to live permanently. This is because there are quality requirements for permanent homes that do not apply to cottages.

Sweden has no ban against using summer houses all year or against using a normal house in summer only. This has made Swedish summer houses popular for Danes, Norwegians, and Germans. But in some desirable coastal areas, prices are so high that residents cannot afford a house, making some traditional coastal villages very silent in winter.

See also

 Bothy – simple shelter
 Buitenplaats
 Bungalow – type of single-storey house
 Cottage
 Dacha – seasonal or year-round second homes located in the exurbs of Soviet and Russian cities
 Derby Summer House
 Fog House - a pleasure house often lined with moss.
 Gazebo
 Log cabin
 Mountain hut - building located in the mountains intended to provide food and shelter to mountaineers and hikers
 Mow Cop Castle
 Pavilion
 Pergola
 Pied-à-terre – small living unit, typically located in a large city
 Shepherd's hut
 Shieling
 Small house movement
 Tea house
 Transhumance – seasonal movement of livestock to mountain pastures, sometimes with summer residences for the pastoralists
 Tree house
 Vacation rental

References

External links

Queen Anne's Summer House
Summerhouse 24
The Summer House of the Capitol Complex

House types
Summer
Garden features